Michael John Rodger (born 25 January 1965) is a New Zealand rower.

At the 1994 World Rowing Championships at Eagle Creek Park, Indianapolis, United States, Rodger won a Silver medal in the lightweight men's double sculls with Rob Hamill. In the same boat class, he represented New Zealand at the 1996 Summer Olympics in Atlanta, United States. He is listed as New Zealand Olympian number 738.

References

External links
 
 

1965 births
Living people
New Zealand male rowers
Rowers at the 1996 Summer Olympics
Olympic rowers of New Zealand
World Rowing Championships medalists for New Zealand